Pamela Katz (born April 16, 1958) is an American screenwriter and novelist best known for her collaborations with director Margarethe von Trotta, including Rosenstrasse and Hannah Arendt.

She is currently a teacher of screenwriting at the Tisch School of the Arts.

Early life
Katz was born on April 16, 1958 in Rhinebeck, New York to psychoanalyst Natalie Becker and philosophy professor Joseph Katz who had moved to the United States in 1940 from Leipzig, Germany. In 1980 she received her Bachelor's degree of Arts from Dartmouth College in Hanover, New Hampshire. While she majored in Anthropology, upon graduating she began working in the film world in various technical capacities. This included working with directors such as Martin Scorsese, Mike Nichols and Spike Lee.

Film career

The trajectory of Katz's film career has been marked by her fascinations with historical biography with special attention to the cultural context and ramifications of the holocaust. She began her career as a filmmaker with her debut short In a Jazz Way, a thirty minute film co-directed with Louise Ghertler about dance documentarian Mura Dehn. The film was perceived as unusual for its avoidance of typical documentary tropes and its usage of conversation to convey a sense of Dehn's legacy.

Her breakthrough film Rosenstrasse was co-written with director Margarethe von Trotta and came out in 2003. The film centered around the Rosenstrasse protest which occurred in Berlin in 1943. It was concerned with the concept of the good German during the Nazi era, and though von Trotta insisted it was not intended to "rehabilitate the German," it was criticized by James Adams at the Globe & Mail for being "insufficiently emotionally complex."

When asked about her longtime collaboration with von Trotta, Katz said in a 2004 interview with FF2 Media's Jan Lisa Huttner that:In the course of working with Margarethe, I discovered that Germans artists feel they have to be very careful about how they present Jews. Even a radical, left-wing, politically-perfect woman like Margarethe von Trotta is going to feel nervous about how she presents a Jewish family.... But then I came on board, and I said: “I feel very Jewish and I come from a family that identifies itself as Jewish. But we don’t keep kosher, etc, etc.” That was hard for Margarethe to hear, and it took quite a bit of nerve on her part. A big part of our tension, the creative back and forth between us, came about because I kept saying: “You can do it any way you want to.”Remembrance (2011) is a love story Katz wrote for director Anna Justice which begins with a Polish prisoner (Tomasz) rescuing his Jewish girlfriend (Hannah) from Auschwitz in 1944. After losing each other and becoming convinced that the other is dead, thirty years pass before Hannah sights Tomasz during an interview and the two reconnect. Though the idea was criticized as being unrealistic, Katz said in an interview with Susana Styron that "there [were] actually 600 attempted escapes from Auschwitz, about a third of which were actually successful."

Hannah Arendt (2012), was co-written with director Margarethe von Trotta and was a biographical film depicting a portion of the life of Jewish intellectual Hannah Arendt. The film specifically deals with Arendt's coverage of the trial of Nazi Lieutenant Colonel Adolf Eichmann and the subsequent controversy in academic circles.

Other Work
Outside of film work Katz has a career as a teacher of screenwriting at NYU Tisch School of the Arts as well as a novelist. She has written a historical novel entitled And Speaking of Love which was based on the life of Lotte Lenya.

In 2015, Random House publishing released Katz's book The Partnership: Brecht, Weill, Three Women, and Germany on the Brink, a non-fiction account of the theatrical artists Bertolt Brecht and Kurt Weill's collaboration and subsequent alienation. It covers the years of their friendship while exploring the relationships they had with actresses Lotte Lenya and Helene Weigel as well as the writer Elisabeth Hauptmann.

Personal life
On February 7, 1988, Katz married German cinematographer Florian Ballhaus.

Filmography

References

1958 births
Living people
American women screenwriters
Tisch School of the Arts faculty
Dartmouth College alumni
American women novelists
Novelists from New York (state)